Blue Bluff may refer to:

Blue Bluff (Burke County, Georgia)
Blue Bluff (Union County, Georgia)